is the 46th single by Japanese idol girl group AKB48. It was released on  through You, Be Cool!/King Records. This is the final single appearance of Haruka Shimazaki, who left the group shortly after the release. The single's choreography is also centered by Shimazaki. The title song is used as the theme song of their drama Cabasuka Gakuen premiered on October 30, 2016 and was used for one of the team battles during Produce 48's group battle stage.

The single's title is an example of Wasei-eigo and refers to a state of high excitement instead of any of the usual meanings of "tension" in English.

Track listing

Type-A

Type-B

Type-C

Type-D

Type-E

Theater edition

Senbatsu members

"High Tension"
The center performer is Haruka Shimazaki.
 AKB48 Team A: Anna Iriyama, Haruna Kojima, Haruka Shimazaki , Yui Yokoyama
 Team K: Mion Mukaichi
 Team B: Yuki Kashiwagi, Rena Katō, Yuria Kizaki, Mayu Watanabe
 Team 4: Nana Okada, Saya Kawamoto, Mako Kojima, Haruka Komiyama, Juri Takahashi
 Team 8: Yui Oguri
 SKE48 Team S: Jurina Matsui
 NMB48 Team N: Sayaka Yamamoto
 HKT48 Team H: Haruka Kodama, Rino Sashihara
 Team KIV: Sakura Miyawaki
 Team TII: Hana Matsuoka
 NGT48 Team NIII: Rika Nakai

"Osae Kirenai Shoudou"
This song was performed by this single's unit, Waiting Circle which consists of the following members:
 Team A: Megu Taniguchi, Yui Hiwatashi
 Team K: Tomu Muto
 Team B: Ryoka Oshima, Moe Gotō, Seina Fukuoka 
 Team 4: Yuiri Murayama
 Team 8: Narumi Kurano, Nanami Yamada, Nagisa Sakaguchi
  Kenkyusei: Satone Kubo, Kira Takahashi

"Happy End"
This song is performed by this single's unit Renacchis, a unit that was created on "Renacchi's Sousenkyo" made by member Rena Katō as a joke on the app "755".
 Team A: Natsuki Kojima
 Team K: Yūka Tano, Mion Mukaichi, Mogi Shinobu
 Team B: Ryoka Oshima, Rena Katō, Yuria Kizaki
 Team 4: Ayaka Okada, 
 Team 8: Yui Oguri , Kurena Cho
 Team KII: Yumana Takagi
 Team E: Sumire Sato
 Team BII: Miori Ichikawa
 Team H: Natsumi Tanaka
 Team TII: Hana Matsuoka
 Team NIII: Rika Nakai, Maho Yamaguchi

"Better"
This song serves as Haruka Shimazaki's graduation song, with the Senbatsu members being her good friends from AKB48's 9th Generation.
 Team A: Haruka Shimazaki , Mariko Nakamura, Yui Yokoyama
 Team K: Haruka Shimada
 Team B: Miyu Takeuchi
 Team S: Suzuran Yamauchi
 Team KII: Mina Oba
 Graduates: Mariya Nagao

"Hoshizora no Kimi ni"
This song is performed by Team 8 EAST, with members belonging from the eastern region of Japan, where their prefectures belong.
 Team 8: Mei Abe, Yui Oguri , Erina Oda, Nagisa Sakaguchi , Akari Sato, Shiori Sato, Nanami Sato, Maria Shimizu, Ayane Takahashi, Hijiri Tanikawa, Kurena Cho, Haruna Hashimoto, Yuna Hattori, Tsumugi Hayasaka, Ayaka Hidaritomo, Hitomi Honda, Kasumi Mogi, Yuri Yokomichi, Yui Yokoyama, Nanase Yoshikawa, Hinano Noda, Hatsuka Utada

"Shishunki no Adrenaline"
This song is performed by Team 8 WEST, with members belonging from the western region of Japan, where their prefectures belong.
 Team 8: Mei Abe, Nao Ota, Momoka Onishi, Yurina Gyoten, Narumi Kuranoo , Miu Shitao, Karin Shimoaoki, Kaoru Takaoka, Yuri Tani, Ikumi Nakano, Serika Nagano, Sayuna Hama, Riona Hamamatsu, Kotone Hitomi, Natsuki Hirose, Rena Fukuchi, Rira Miyazato, Karen Yoshida, Moka Yaguchi, Nanami Yamada, Ruka Yamamoto, Miyu Yoshino, Misaki Terada

"Seijun Tired"
This song is sang by the unit "Tentoumu Chu!", which was originally a Kenkyuusei unit soon turned into active unit.
 Team 4: Nana Okada, Mako Kojima , Miki Nishino
 Team S: Ryoha Kitagawa
 Team BII: Nagisa Shibuya
 Team H: Meru Tashima
 Team KIV: Mio Tomonaga

"Mata Anata no Koto o Kangaeteta"
This song is sang by this single's unit Team Vocal, who are known to be the best vocalists of their Teams.
 Team A: Miho Miyazaki
 Team K: Yūka Tano, Minami Minegishi 
 Team 8: Erina Oda
 Team S: Rion Azuma, Suzuran Yamauchi
 Team KII: Akane Takayanagi, Nao Furuhata
 Team N: Natsuko Akashi
 Team M: Miru Shiroma
 Team TII: Erena Sakamoto

Release history

MNL48 version

The Filipino idol group MNL48, a sister group of AKB48, covered the song with the same title. It is their Fifth single released on November 25,2019.

Tracklisting

 Bold indicates centers.

Further reading

References

External links
  

AKB48 songs
MNL48 songs
2016 singles
2016 songs
Songs with lyrics by Yasushi Akimoto
King Records (Japan) singles
Oricon Weekly number-one singles
Billboard Japan Hot 100 number-one singles